Saturnin Soglo is a Beninese politician. He was the foreign minister of Benin from 1992 to 1993, serving under his brother president Nicéphore Soglo.

References

Year of birth missing (living people)
Living people
Foreign ministers of Benin
Place of birth missing (living people)
20th-century Beninese politicians